West Point may refer to:
West Point, Fayette County, Texas
West Point, Lynn County, Texas